is a Japanese manga series written by Haro Aso and illustrated by Kotaro Takata. It has been serialized in Shogakukan's seinen manga magazine Monthly Sunday Gene-X since October 2018, with its chapters collected into thirteen tankōbon volumes as of February 2023. The series is licensed for English release in North America by Viz Media. An anime television series adaptation by Bug Films is set to premiere in July 2023. A live-action film adaptation is set to premiere on Netflix in 2023.

Characters

 / 

 /

Media

Manga
Zom 100: Bucket List of the Dead is written by Haro Aso and illustrated by Kotaro Takata. The series began in Shogakukan's seinen manga magazine Monthly Sunday Gene-X on October 19, 2018. Shogakukan has collected its chapters into individual tankōbon volumes. The first volume was released on March 19, 2019. As of February 17, 2023, thirteen volumes have been released.

In North America, Viz Media announced the English release of the series in July 2020. The series is licensed in France by Kana.

Volume list

Film
On June 7, 2022, during the Geeked Week livestream, Netflix announced that a live-action film adaptation had been green-lit. Yusuke Ishida is directing the film, based on a screenplay by Tatsuro Mishima. Akira Morii is serving as producer, in collaboration with ROBOT and Plus One Entertainment. The film is set to premiere in 2023.

Anime
On January 6, 2023, an anime television series adaptation was announced, as part of a deal between Viz Media, Shogakukan, and Shogakukan-Shueisha Productions. It is produced by Bug Films and directed by Kazuki Kawagoe, with assistant direction by Hanako Ueda, scripts supervised by Hiroshi Seko, character designs by Kii Tanaka, zombie designs by Junpei Fukuchi, and music composed by Makoto Miyazaki. The series is set to premiere in July 2023. Hulu will stream the series in the United States.

Reception
The series was nominated for the Eisner Award in the Best U.S. Edition of International Material—Asia and Best Humor Publication categories in 2022.

References

External links
 
 

2023 anime television series debuts
Anime series based on manga
Comedy anime and manga
Dystopian anime and manga
Gunma Prefecture in fiction
Horror anime and manga
Japanese comedy films
Japanese horror films
Japanese-language Netflix original films
Manga adapted into films
Seinen manga
Shogakukan manga
Upcoming anime television series
Viz Media anime
Viz Media manga
Zombies in anime and manga